Peter Drew Durack, QC (20 October 1926– 13 July 2008) was an Australian politician, representing the Liberal Party.  He rose to become Attorney-General of Australia.

He served in the Senate from 1 July 1971 to 30 June 1993.  From 1987 to 1989, he was a joint Father of the Senate along with Arthur Gietzelt, and from 1989 until his retirement, he held that title alone.

Biography
Durack was educated at Aquinas College and the University of Western Australia.  He was the state's 1949 Rhodes Scholar and studied law at Lincoln College, Oxford, where he later taught. From 1956 he worked as a barrister in Perth and in 1965 was elected into the Western Australian Legislative Assembly as the Member for Perth, a seat he held until 1968.  He moved to federal politics by winning one of the Senate seats in the 1970 Senate election, taking office on 1 July 1971.

He was Minister for Repatriation in the Fraser government from July to October 1976, when the title of the portfolio was changed to Minister for Veterans' Affairs.  In 1977, he was appointed Attorney-General, serving in that office until the Fraser government's defeat in 1983. During that time he was responsible for the passage of the Freedom of Information Act 1982; he had introduced a private member's bill on the same subject in 1972.

He was deputy Leader of the Opposition in the Senate from 1983 to 1987, and 1990 to 1992.

In 1992, he failed to win preselection by his party for a further term, and his political career ended in June 1993.

The Commonwealth Law Courts Building on Victoria Avenue in Perth, Western Australia were named after Durack in 2005.

He died in Perth on 13 July 2008.

Publications 

Durack wrote several books, dealing with legal issues and the Mabo court case, with which he was involved during his time as Attorney-General.
Evidence.  / 
The External Affairs Power  / 
Mabo and After (with Ron Brunton & Tony Rutherford).  /

Family
Durack was a grandson of Kimberley pioneer Jeremiah Durack, who was an uncle of Michael Patrick Durack (1865–1950). He was therefore a cousin of authors Mary and Elizabeth Durack.

Durack was married to Isabel, with whom he had daughter Anne and son Philip.

References

 

1926 births
2008 deaths
Liberal Party of Australia members of the Parliament of Australia
Members of the Western Australian Legislative Assembly
Members of the Australian Senate for Western Australia
Members of the Australian Senate
Members of the Cabinet of Australia
Attorneys-General of Australia
Australian Rhodes Scholars
People educated at Aquinas College, Perth
University of Western Australia alumni
Alumni of Lincoln College, Oxford
20th-century King's Counsel
Australian King's Counsel
20th-century Australian politicians